Central Township may refer to:

 Central Township, Bond County, Illinois
 Central Township, Jefferson County, Missouri
 Central Township, Knox County, Nebraska
 Central Township, Merrick County, Nebraska

Township name disambiguation pages